Equatorial Guinea–Turkey relations are the foreign relations between Equatorial Guinea and Turkey. Turkey has an Embassy in Malabo since June 1, 2018 and the embassy of Equatorial Guinea in Ankara opened in December 2018.

Diplomatic Relations  

The relations between the two countries improved dramatically recently. 

Following the publication of the French involvement in the training of the militia and the political police force of Francisco Macías Nguema, Turkey — along with Western allies and condemned France’s official policy in 1994.

Since then, relations improved under  President Teodoro Obiang Nguema Mbasogo.

Presidential Visits

Economic Relations  
 Trade volume between the two countries was 23.8 million USD in 2019 (Turkish exports/imports: 20.2/3.6 million USD).
 There are direct flights from Istanbul to Malabo since February 7, 2020.

See also 

 Foreign relations of Equatorial Guinea
 Foreign relations of Turkey

References 

Turkey
Bilateral relations of Turkey